John Griffith Davies (17 May 1929 
– 24 March 2020) was an Australian-American swimmer and United States federal judge. As a breaststroke swimmer of the 1940s and 1950s, he won a gold medal in the 200-metre breaststroke at the 1952 Summer Olympics in Helsinki, set a world record in the 200 yard breaststroke (short course) and tied the world record in the 200 m breaststroke (long course). After retiring from competition swimming, he became a lawyer in California and, after becoming a naturalized American, was appointed a United States district judge of the United States District Court for the Central District of California by President Ronald Reagan in 1986, and presided over the trial of the Los Angeles Police Department officers charged with assaulting Rodney King.

Swimming career
Davies entered and won both breaststroke events at the 1946 New South Wales Championships held at Manly. He began to train under Forbes Carlile in 1947 and won the 220yd breaststroke at the Australian Championships, as well as helping New South Wales to win the 3x110yd medley relay. He repeated these victories at the 1948 Australian Championships, earning selection to the 1948 Summer Olympics in London at the age of 19. In the lead up to the Games, he won two races in London. Davies came in second in his heat and fourth in his semifinal with an Australian record 2m 44.8s to qualify for the final of the 200m breaststroke. Davies set a new Australian record in the final, finishing 4th and recording a time of 2m 43.7s. His time was faster than the bronze medallist's but the judges ranked him as 4th.

After the Games, Davies enrolled at the University of Michigan in Ann Arbor, Michigan, where he trained under the guidance of coach Matt Mann and became a two time All American. Without scholarship support being available for swimmers during that era, he pursued a political science degree, while supporting himself by washing dishes and working at the International Student Centre. Mann also altered Davies's style, changing from the even-paced racing of Carlile to an early-attack oriented style of swimming. Davies managed a second placing at the 200yd breaststroke at the NCAA Championships in 1948 but failed to place in 1949 and 1950. In 1951 he won the 200m breaststroke at the AAU National Outdoor Championships and in 1952 won the 200yd breaststroke short course at the NCAA Championships setting a new world record of 2:21.9 and the 200m Breaststroke AAU National Indoor Championship. The Australian Olympic Federation granted him an exemption from the Australian Championships and selected him for the 1952 Summer Olympics in Helsinki. He trained with fellow team member John Marshall at Yale University under coach Robert Kiphuth while the rest of the Australian team trained in Townsville.

Davies arrived in Helsinki as the favourite after setting the 200-yard breaststroke (short course) world record earlier in the year, but after a poor time trial a week before the Games, he was forced to restrict his training to under a kilometre per day and sleep for 20 hours daily. Davies was not the fastest qualifier in the heats but broke the Olympic record set by Jerry Holan in the prelims.  Swimming in his even-paced style, Davies trailed by more than 2 seconds at the 100m mark, but overhauled his rivals, pipping the United States' Bowen Stassforth by 0.3s to reset his new Olympic record and tie the existing world record (long course) time of 2m 34.4s set by Herbert Klein of Germany who was third. Davies, Stassforth, and Klein were the only three swimmers to better 2:35 in history in the 200 m breaststroke (long course) prior to the bifurcation of the stroke in 1953.

Legal career 
Davies graduated from the UCLA School of Law in 1959. He became a U.S. citizen in 1960.

On 22 April 1986, Davies was nominated by U.S. president Ronald Reagan to a seat on the United States District Court for the Central District of California vacated by Cynthia Holcomb Hall. Davies was confirmed by the United States Senate on 6 June 1986, and received his commission on 9 June 1986. 

In January 1991, Davies found that the no obscenity clause in National Endowment for the Arts grants violated the Constitution's Free Speech Clause. In April 1996, Davies overturned the state conviction of Charles Keating for his involvement in the savings and loan scandal due to flawed jury instructions. In June 1998, Davies mediated the $400 million settlement which Merrill Lynch agreed to pay for its role in causing the Orange County, California bankruptcy.

In 1993, Davies presided over the federal retrial of four Los Angeles Police Department officers for the beating of Rodney King. Two officers, Stacey Koon and Laurence Powell were convicted. The United States Federal Sentencing Guidelines recommend the offenders serve up to ten years in prison. Instead, Davies sentenced the offenders to 30 months. Davies' sentencing was vacated by the  United States Court of Appeals for the Ninth Circuit  in August 1994 for violating the sentencing guidelines. In February 1996, that judgment was itself reversed by the Supreme Court of the United States, which found that Davies had not abused his discretion.

Davies faced widespread public criticism for the lightness of the sentences he delivered to the former police officers.
Congressional representative Maxine Waters called the sentences a "kiss on the wrist".  Joseph Duff of the ACLU called the sentencing "a travesty of Justice".

Later life
Davies died on March 24, 2020, at the age of 90, from cancer.

Retired U.S. District Court Judge Robert C. Bonner said of his former colleague: “He was one of the best federal judges ever to serve, and to my knowledge the only Olympics gold medalist to become a federal judge. In my view, he was ‘the Judge who saved L.A. with his superb handling of the federal civil rights trial of the police who beat Rodney King. We have lost a great judge and a good friend.  He was also a masterful trial lawyer before his appointment to the bench.”

Honours
Davies was inducted into the International Swimming Hall of Fame in 1984, and the Sport Australia Hall of Fame in 1992. He received an Australian Sports Medal in 2000.

Record Notes
The world record for the 200-meter breaststroke prior to the bifurcation of the butterfly breaststroke into separate strokes in 1953 could be accomplished in either short or long course pools. FINA recognized only one world record for the 200-meter breaststroke.  The 1952 US Olympic Book lists the 200-meter breaststroke world record as belonging to Herbert Klein with a time of 2:27.3 who swam it in a short course pool. If records were measured as they are today in long and short course pools, Davies tied Herbert Klein's long course world record of 2:34.4 for the 200-meter breaststroke set on August 13, 1950, in Göppingen, Germany at their 1952 Olympic final.

See also
 List of members of the International Swimming Hall of Fame
 List of Olympic medalists in swimming (men)
 World record progression 200 metres breaststroke

References

Sources
 
 
 Wallechinsky, David and Jaime Loucky (2008). "Swimming (Men): 200-Meter Breaststroke". In The Complete Book of the Olympics – 2008 Edition. London: Aurum Press, Limited. p. 929.

External links

 Official website of John Davies
 

|-

1929 births
2020 deaths
California lawyers
Australian emigrants to the United States
Judges of the United States District Court for the Central District of California
Michigan Wolverines men's swimmers
Olympic gold medalists for Australia
Olympic swimmers of Australia
Australian male breaststroke swimmers
Sport Australia Hall of Fame inductees
Swimmers at the 1948 Summer Olympics
Swimmers at the 1952 Summer Olympics
Swimmers from Sydney
United States district court judges appointed by Ronald Reagan
20th-century American judges
UCLA School of Law alumni
Medalists at the 1952 Summer Olympics
Olympic gold medalists in swimming
People with acquired American citizenship